Odites metascia is a moth in the family Depressariidae. It was described by Edward Meyrick in 1937. It is found in South Africa.

References

Endemic moths of South Africa
Moths described in 1937
Odites
Taxa named by Edward Meyrick